The Metropolitan District Commission of Connecticut (MDC) is a public non-profit municipal corporation chartered by the Connecticut General Assembly in 1929 to provide drinking water and sewer service to the Hartford area. The original agreement tied together the water systems of Hartford, Bloomfield, Newington, Wethersfield, and Windsor. The MDC currently serves eight towns in the Hartford area. The MDC is run by a 29-member board of commissioners; 17 of which are appointed by the member towns, eight by the governor, and four by legislative leaders. The current Chairman of the MDC Board is William A. DiBella.

History

The MDC began acquiring land for the planned Barkhamsted Reservoir two and a half years before its charter was granted. in 1932 under Chairman Charles Goodwin the MDC was forced to slow its land acquisition as a result of the great depression.

In the 21st century the MDC has faced criticism for opaque business practices and offering deep discounts to select industrial users without public consultation. Regulators at PURA have suggested increased transparency and external audits in addition to the MDC's own.

In 2017 the MDC began work on The South Hartford Conveyance and Storage Tunnel, the largest project in the District's history. The 18 ft diameter tunnel will extend four miles at a depth of over 200 ft and will carry stormwater during significant rain events, this project is the cornerstone of a larger sewer-stormwater separation project aimed at improving water quality in Wethersfield Cove, the Connecticut River, and Long Island Sound. The South Hartford Conveyance and Storage Tunnel project has an estimated budget of over $500 million.

Reservoirs 

The Barkhamsted Reservoir was created with the completion of the Saville Dam on the Farmington River. The Barkhamsted Reservoir has a filled volume of 36.8 billion US gallons (139,000,000 m3) and is the largest impoundment on the Farmington River system. The reservoir was completed in 1940 at a cost of $10 million. Filling the reservoir destroyed much of the town of Barkhamsted Hollow. Water from the Barkhamstead Reservoir is transferred by pipes to filtration stations in West Hartford and Bloomfield using only the force of gravity.

The West Hartford Reservoirs are a series of five reservoirs and a number of ponds and water tanks in West Hartford, Connecticut. The Revolutionary War Campsite is a historic archaeological site located on MDC land near Reservoir #6.

Nepaug Reservoir

Lake McDonough and Hogback Reservoir

Headquarters
The current MDC headquarters on the corner of Main and Wells in Downtown Hartford was built in the late 1970s and has ~60,000 square feet of floor space. Its brutalist facade matches the design language of neighboring buildings.

Metropolitan District Commission Police
The MDC has its own police force to enforce the law and protect its various operations. According to the MDC use of its facilities is "regulated by the Connecticut Department of Public Health (Section 24-43c of the Connecticut General Statutes) and enforced by MDC police." The current Chief of Police of The MDC Police is Henry Martin. In 2011 CEO Charles Sheehan stated that Metropolitan District Officers operate both in uniform and in plain clothes, and that they maintain order at the MDC's corporate headquarters in addition to the field facilities.

Controversies

Niagara Bottling Plant
In 2015 the MDC faced criticism over a deal with Niagara Bottling that provided the first bulk discount since the District began operating. They kept the deal secret until after it had been completed and did not offer a chancellor public comment. The Bloomfield Town Council faced criticism for not consulting or notifying the public of the bottling plant, and a significant tax abatement, until after the deal was made. There have been calls for increased transparency.

In 2016 the MBD Board voted to discontinue the Niagara discount, the change was part of an effort to restore public trust after the scandal over secrecy and lack of public oversight.

Chairman DiBella 
In 2008 MDC Chairman William A. DiBella was ordered to pay $795,000 in restitution for his key role in a fraudulent investment scheme involving former State Treasurer Paul J. Silvester and Thayer Capital Partners. DiBella and his associates were paid kickbacks from Thayer in return for placing money from the Connecticut State Retirement and Trust Fund into their funds. The scheme unbalanced the State Retirement and Trust Fund portfolio, potentially putting a huge number of State Retirement accounts at risk.

DiBella was MDC Chairman at the time and there have been widespread calls for him to step down, mainly citing his SEC case, the ethics of public office, and the inherent moral corruption of his acts leading to questions about his character. The Federation of Connecticut Taxpayer Organizations has added DiBella to their “Hall of Shame” of politicians who grossly betray the public's trust in addition to calling for him to be stripped of his MDC position. Fellow MDC Commissioner Mark Pappa stated that “If this was a publicly traded company this conversation wouldn’t even happen because there’s no question Mr. DiBella would not be sitting here.”

Discrimination lawsuits
In 2002 the MDC paid $1.5m to settle claims of discrimination against female and minority employees. MDC Chairman William A. DiBella claimed that the settlement was a result of ``The district wanted to get this behind them.’’ A jury in 2000 had awarded the plaintiff, Sharon Harper, $4.6m after finding that MDC officials had defamed her. The Officials spread rumors about Harper that were of a sexual nature and the jury found them to be on their face defamatory, this was seen as highly offensive to Harper because she was a Churchgoer with a conservative southern background. This was the third time in eight years that the MDC was found to be at fault for discriminating against minority employees. Despite the communities it serves being highly diverse the Hartford Courant in 2002 classified the senior management of the MDC as "overwhelmingly white.”

In 2016 the MDC paid $350,000 to settle the case Lebert Thomas v. The Metropolitan District et al. It was alleged that the MDC discriminated against Mr. Thomas on the basis of his race. A confidentiality clause was included with the settlement.

Board of Commissioners
As of September 21st, 2021 the MDC Board of Commissioners consisted of:

Andrew Adil
John Avedisian
Clifford Avery Buell
Rick Bush
Donald M. Currey
Mary Anne Charron
William A. DiBella (Chairman)
David Drake
Peter Gardow
James Healy
Allen Hoffman
Christian Hoheb
Georgiana Holloway
David Ionno
Shubhada Kambli
Mary LaChance
Gary LeBeau
Byron Lester
Diane Lewis
Maureen Magnan (Vice Chairwoman)
Jackie Gorsky Mandyke
Michael Maniscalco
Alphonse Marotta
Domenic M. Pane
Bhupen Patel
Jon Petoskey
Pasquale J. Salemi
Raymond Sweezy
Alvin Taylor
Michael Torres
Richard W. Vicino
James Woulfe

References

Companies based in Hartford, Connecticut
Companies based in Hartford County, Connecticut
Organizations based in Hartford, Connecticut
Organizations based in Connecticut
Public utilities of the United States
Specialist police departments of Connecticut